Sybra quadripunctata is a species of beetle in the family Cerambycidae. It was described by Breuning in 1939. It is known from Indonesia.

References

quadripunctata
Beetles described in 1939